Llangyfelach is a village and community located in the City and County of Swansea, Wales.  Llangyfelach is situated about 4 miles north of the centre of Swansea, just west of Morriston. It falls within the Llangyfelach ward.  To the west is open moorland. The population was 2,510 as of the 2011 UK census.
The name is seemingly derived from a combination of 'llan' and 'Cyfelach' (the name of a saint), with a mutation to combine them for Llangyfelach.

Description
Llangyfelach was once the name of a parish that covered much of the former Lordship of Gower. Today's community covers a smaller area including the site of the former Felindre tinplate works, which hosted the National Eisteddfod in 2006.

Bordering the village to the north is the M4 motorway Junction 46.  The village has its own primary school, crematorium, post office, The 'Plough and Harrow' pub, and a Scout hall.

At the centre of the village is the Parish Church of St David and Cyfelach. The site dates back to the 6th Century: St. David the Patron Saint of Wales founded an early Celtic monastery there. The present church has a 12th Century detached tower and a converted tithe barn as the present church. Contained within the church is the Llangyfelach Cross, a 9th Century Celtic stone.

Llangyfelach was the birthplace of the painter Evan Walters, and is mentioned in a folk song about the practice of 'pressing' men into military service.

Future developments
There are proposals to develop a new 18 hole championship golf course and leisure complex near the village called Royal Fern Park.  In August 2008, it was announced that the plan was approved by the local council and would not be blocked by the Welsh Assembly.  Part of the development will include residential housing and a clubhouse with fitness and leisure facilities.

References

External links
 
Evening Post - Story on Royal Fern Leisure Complex
Royal Fern Park (Swansea LDP)

Communities in Swansea
Villages in Swansea